The Millennium Development Authority (MiDA) is a Government of Ghana organization established by an Act of Parliament (Act 702, 709 & 897) as amended. The Authority has the prime aim to oversee, manage and implement the programmes under the Compact Agreement signed with the Millennium Challenge Corporation of the United States of America.

The Authority, in 2012, successfully completed implementing the first Compact agreement between Ghana and the Millennium Challenge Corporation. The first Compact, a 547 million dollar grant, was used to implement agriculture, roads and educational projects which collectively would contribute to reducing poverty in Ghana and boost economic growth. The current Compact, is to last for five years (2016-2021) and is a 498.2 million dollar grant. The funds are being used to implement 6 major projects that have been designed to collectively transform Ghana’s power sector and stimulate private sector investments into the sector .

MiDA Board
The MiDA board is made up of fourteen members with eleven of them having voting rights. The members are:

Voting Members 

Yaa Ntiamoah Badu - Chairperson
Ken Ofori-Atta - Minister for Finance
Alan Kyerematen - Minister for Trade and Industry
John Peter Amewu - Minister for Energy
Gloria Afua Akuffo - Attorney General & Minister for Justice Otiko Afisa Djaba - Minister for Gender, Children &

Social Protection 

Ibrahim Mohammed Awal - Minister for Business Development
Martin Eson-Benjamin - CEO, Millennium Development Authority
Samuel Kobina DeSouza - Rep. of Private Enterprise Federation
Humphrey Ayim Dake - Rep. Association of Ghana Industries

Non-voting Members 

Chairman of ECG Board
Chairman of NEDCo Board
Kenneth James Miller - Resident Country Director, Millennium Challenge Corporation.

References

Ministries and Agencies of State of Ghana